Roswell, Texas is a serialized, online graphic novel which started in 2006 and was completed early in 2008. It appeared in installments on the web site of Big Head Press. Written by science fiction novelist L. Neil Smith with Rex F. May (better known as the cartoonist Baloo) and illustrated by artist Scott Bieser, with coloring by Jen Zach and lettering by Zeke Bieser, Roswell, Texas is an alternate history set in a universe in which Davy Crockett survived the Alamo and Santa Anna didn't, and in which an expanded Texas eventually became the "Federated States of Texas" rather than one of the United States.

The novel's plot centers around the 1947 crash of an unidentified flying object (analogous to the "real-world" Roswell UFO incident) near Roswell, the westernmost city of the Federated States of Texas (analogous to the real-world town of Roswell, New Mexico). Its theme incorporates Smith's well-known libertarian philosophy and sensibilities.

Outside of North America, other differences between our timeline and this one exist. World War II (known as the "European War" in this universe) is still being fought into the late 1940s, without Japanese or American involvement. The United Kingdom has allied with Nazi Germany, with King Edward VIII becoming a puppet ruler. Many European people have emigrated to Texas. The United States have suspended the Bill of Rights. California never joined the Union, becoming an independent state like Texas in the novel.

Roswell, Texas makes extensive use of anachronism and anatopism in its story line. Historical personalities including Charles Lindbergh (and his son, Charles Lindbergh Jr., who in real life was abducted and murdered as an infant), Audie Murphy, Malcolm X, Pope John Paul II, Gene Roddenberry, Eliot Ness, Lawrence of Arabia, Charles de Gaulle, Walt Disney and others appear in roles often tangentially related to, but always significantly different from, their "real-world" biographies. Additionally, characters from Smith's other works (notably William "Win" Bear, protagonist of The Probability Broach and other novels in Smith's North American Confederacy series) appear in key or supporting roles as "alternate history" versions of their own fictional selves.

As of March 18, 2008, Roswell, Texas was complete at 640 pages—some consisting of a single illustration, others of multiple panels.

In June 2008, a gray-scale paperback reprint of Roswell, Texas was published by Big Head Press.

External links
Roswell, Texas online at Big Head Press

Alternate history comics
Libertarian science fiction
Roswell incident in fiction
Science fiction webcomics
Davy Crockett
2006 webcomic debuts
2008 webcomic endings
2000s webcomics